HD 212301 is a binary star system in the south circumpolar constellation of Octans. This star is also called HIP 110852. With an apparent visual magnitude of 7.76, it is too faint to be visible to the naked eye. The system is located at a distance of 177 light years from the Sun based on parallax, and is drifting further away with a radial velocity of +4.7 km/s. It has an absolute magnitude of 4.06.

The primary, component A, is an F-type main-sequence star with a stellar classification of F8V. It has 20% greater mass than the Sun and a 23% larger radius. Its age is about the same as the Sun and it is spinning with a projected rotational velocity of 5.4 km/s. It is a metal-rich star with 50% more metals than the Sun has. The star is radiating 1.9 times the luminosity of the Sun from its photosphere at an effective temperature of 6,169 K.

A secondary companion was announced in 2009. This is a red dwarf with an estimated class of M3V and a mass equal to around 35% of the mass of the Sun. The pair share a common proper motion.

A hot jupiter candidate exoplanet was discovered orbiting the primary, based on radial velocity observations taken in 2003 and 2005.

See also 
 HD 213240
 List of extrasolar planets

References

External links 
 

F-type main-sequence stars
M-type main-sequence stars
Planetary systems with one confirmed planet
Binary stars
Octans
Durchmusterung objects
212301
110852